Chenar Bon (also Romanized as Chenār Bon; also known as Chenarbend and Chenār Bon-e Yūr Maḩalleh) is a village in Lalehabad Rural District, Lalehabad District, Babol County, Mazandaran Province, Iran. At the 2006 census, its population was 562, in 147 families.

References 

Populated places in Babol County